Sorry for Partyin' is the seventh studio album by American pop punk band Bowling for Soup. It is the band's sixth and final album to be released by Jive Records. It was released on October 12, 2009. It debuted at No. 104 on the Billboard 200 and No. 47 on Rock albums. No single was released to the radio for the album.

Production and recording
The band began working on the album in January 2009 in Austin, Texas by working with people like Linus of Hollywood, Scott Reynolds, Tony Scalzo, Parry Gripp and Kim Shattuck.
The band entered the studio on January 21 with 18 demos and a list of names for possible guest appearances. The band recorded for over a month, recording 18 tracks and finished recording in early March 2009. 
One local Austin, Texas fan by the name of Lindsay was selected by the band to sit in during the recording process with the purpose of providing studio updates that would be posted for the band's official website. 
The recording process began with Gary's drumming sessions, "I Can't Stand L.A." was the first titled song published. Also that month Erik recorded bass for "I Don't Wish You Were Dead Anymore" and "America(Wake Up Amy). Guitars were recorded for "Choke", "If Only", and "BFFF" on January 31. 
In February "Goodbye Friend" and 4 more songs were recorded on guitar then Jaret would start the vocal tracks. Scott Reynold of the band ALL would stop by to discuss singing on the album.

Afterward, the band left Austin to record the B-sides for the album in their hometown.

Bowling for Soup recorded 27 songs for the album as of June 2009. 
On August 8, Jaret posted on Twitter that the band had enough songs for a double album, but will only be putting 12-14 of those songs onto this album.

Release
In promotion for the album, the band embarked on a tour titled the "Party in Your Pants Tour." The tour only had dates scheduled in the UK beginning on October 17, 2009, in Glasgow and ending on October 29, 2009, in London. They played a few shows in December 2009 leading up to Christmas. Following this, they embarked on a US tour in January and February 2010.

Track listing

Bonus tracks

B-sides

Singles and videos

According to frontman Jaret Reddick in his ninth Bowling for Soup podcast, "No Hablo Inglés" was supposed to be released to radio stations in January 2010 as the album's first single. However, Bowling for Soup was dropped from Jive Records shortly after the release of Sorry for Partyin and because of this, songs like "My Wena" and "No Hablo Inglés" that had released music videos were not released as radio singles.

My Wena
The song "My Wena" first previewed on May 5, 2009, on the Lex and Terry show. A music video for the song was filmed and the video was released on July 21, 2009. The song was released to iTunes on July 28, 2009. The video was filmed at and around Gary Wiseman’s home in Prosper, TX.  Dallas photographer Jason Janik shot the single’s cover art in between filming for the video.  An EP featuring the song, titled the My Wena EP was released digitally August 7, 2009. A clean version of the "My Wena" video (later titled the "Puppy Version") was released on the band's official YouTube page on August 28, 2009.

No Hablo Inglés
The song "No Hablo Inglés" first premiered to members on the BFS Army site to those who had contributed, the page claims this is the first single.

The music video for the song is a parody of the As seen on TV infomercials.  In the video, Jaret Reddick stands in front of a TV studio audience and portrays a motivational speaker offering his "fool-proof" solution to any problem – simply reply "No Hablo Inglés" (Spanish for "I don't speak English") and the problem disappears.  The video features a telephone number (which answers to a Bowling for Soup fan line) and an address (a private mailbox at a UPS Store in Flower Mound, Texas, located south of Denton).

Release history

PersonnelBowling for Soup: Jaret Reddick — vocals & rhythm guitar
 Erik Chandler — bass & Backing vocals
 Chris Burney — lead guitar & Backing vocals
 Gary Wiseman — drumsProduction:BFS crew
 Dave "Termite Dave" Hale - Tour Manager/ baby sitter. Tony "T-Ride" Gattone - Guitar/ Bass Tech/ sandwich artist. Jacob "Pinky" Henry - Stage Manager/ Monitors/ Drum Tech/ funny hats. Blake Hunt - Merch and breath of fresh air. Wayne Neil - driver/ swell guy/ Australian. Sherman - is a dog.
 Produced by Linus of Hollywood & Jaret Reddick; Engineered by Peter McCabe at Wire Recording Studio, Austin, TX; Assisted by Joey Benjamin; Studio Assistant: Will Krienke; Studio Interns: Matt Ralls & Kent Chandler; "No Hablo Inglés" Engineered by Casey Diiorio at Valve Studios, Dallas, TX; Additional Recording at Valve Studios, Dallas, TX and Kingsize Soundlabs, Los Angeles
 Mixed by Chris Lord-Alge at Mix L.A.; Assistant Mix Engineers: Keith Armstrong, Nik Karpen; Additional Mix Engineering: Brad Townsend, Andrew Schubert
 Mastered by Tom Coyne at Sterling Sound, NYC
Additional musicians:
 Linus of Hollywood: Additional Guitar, Keyboards, Backing Vocals, Gang Vocals, Fart Noises and Percussion; Tony Scalzo: Piano & Organ on "BFFF;" Piano on "If Only" and "I Don't Wish You Were Dead Anymore;" Scott Reynolds: Chorus Vox "America (Wake Up Amy);" Parry Gripp: Sang "America (Wake Up Amy);" Gang Vocals on "Only Young" and "Hooray for Beer;" Zac Maloy: Sweet-ass Backing Vocals at the end of "Love Goes Boom"
 A&R: Teresa LaBarbera Whites; Booking: Andy Somers at The Agency Group; Management: Mike Swinford for Rainmaker Artists; Legal: Mike McKoy at Serling Rooks & Ferrara
 Album Photography by Jason Janik; Additional Photography by Peter McCabe (page 5 band insert), Brad Bond (page 2) and Joshua Marc Levy (pages 4–5, 8)
 Package Art Direction & Design by Joshua Marc Levy and Brad Bond, 15th Anniversary Cake Illustration by Steven Ray Brown.

NotesA'  Featured in frontman Jaret Reddick's fifth Bowling for Soup podcast, released January 15, 2010.

References

2009 albums
Bowling for Soup albums
Jive Records albums